Ciofrângeni is a commune in Argeș County, Muntenia, Romania. It is composed of five villages: Burluși, Ciofrângeni, Lacurile, Piatra and Schitu-Matei.

References

Communes in Argeș County
Localities in Muntenia